Kimberly Phillips-Fein (born August 1975) is an American historian. and a Full professor at the Gallatin School of Individualized Study and the History Department of the College of Arts and Science at New York University (NYU). Her book Fear City: New York’s Fiscal Crisis and the Rise of Austerity Politics was named a finalist for the 2018 Pulitzer Prize for History.

Early life and education
Phillips-Fein was born in New York City in August 1975 and was raised in downtown Brooklyn. She received her Bachelor of Arts degree in history from the University of Chicago in 1997 before enrolling at Columbia University for her PhD.

Career
After she received her PhD, Phillips-Fein joined the faculty at New York University (NYU) and became a 2008–09 NYU Center for the Humanities Fellow. With the assistance of this fellowship, she published her first book, Invisible Hands: The Businessmen's Crusade Against the New Deal. The book is an account of how high-powered individuals fought against the legacy of the New Deal from World War to the election of Ronald Reagan as President. Following this publication, she received a Cullman Center for Scholars, Artists and Writers fellowship at the New York Public Library for the 2014–15 academic year to write her second book.

Phillips-Fein published her second book, Fear City: New York's Fiscal Crisis and the Rise of Austerity Politics, in 2017. The book "explores the causes, effects, and the legacy of New York City’s fiscal crisis of 1975".  Fear City was named a finalist for the 2018 Pulitzer Prize for History and she received a 2020 Guggenheim Fellowship.

References

Living people
1975 births
Columbia University alumni
New York University faculty
University of Chicago alumni
American historians
American women historians
21st-century American women writers